Penicillium nothofagi is a species of fungus in the genus Penicillium.

References

nothofagi
Fungi described in 2011